William Tully (1931 or 1932 – 10 January 1976) was an Australian diver. He competed in the men's 10-metre platform event at the 1956 Summer Olympics. Tully died of cancer in 1976, aged 44.

References

External links
 
 

1930s births
1976 deaths
Australian male divers
Olympic divers of Australia
Divers at the 1956 Summer Olympics
Place of birth missing
20th-century Australian people